Schenectady County Airport  is a county-owned, public-use airport located three nautical miles (6 km) north of the central business district of Schenectady, a city in Schenectady County, New York, United States. It is included in the National Plan of Integrated Airport Systems for 2011–2015, which categorized it as a reliever airport.

Founded in 1927, the airport is home to Richmor Aviation, Fortune Air, the 109th Airlift Wing (109 AW) of the New York Air National Guard, the Empire State Aerosciences Museum, and several private aircraft.

Stratton Air National Guard Base
Schenectady County Airport's military enclave is named Stratton Air National Guard Base. It has hosted the New York Air National Guard 109th Airlift Wing (in various designations) since 1949.  The base is named after conservative Democratic US Representative Sam Stratton, who represented the Albany area. The wing is unique as it is the only USAF unit equipped with 10 ski-equipped C-130 Hercules aircraft, and provides the nation's only air cargo lift capability to polar destinations.   Since 1971, the 109th has played an important role in support of the National Science Foundation's research expeditions at both the North and South Poles.

Annually, the base hosts the Civil Air Patrol's New York Wing Encampment, a one-week event that teaches and applies leadership skills.

Facilities and aircraft 
Schenectady County Airport covers an area of 750 acres (304 ha) at an elevation of 378 feet (115 m) above mean sea level. It has two asphalt paved runways: 4/22 is 7,000 by 150 feet (2,134 x 46 m); 10/28 is 4,850 by 150 feet (1,478 x 46 m); 15/33, now a taxiway, is 2,864 by 50 feet (873 x 15 m).

For the 12-month period ending December 31, 2009, the airport had 62,588 aircraft operations, an average of 171 per day: 79% general aviation, 15% military, and 6% air taxi. At that time there were 110 aircraft based at this airport: 72% single-engine, 7% multi-engine, 6% jet, 2% helicopter, and 13% military.

References

External links 
 Airport official page at Schenectady County website
 109th Airlift Wing
  from New York State DOT
 
 

Airports in New York (state)
Transportation buildings and structures in Schenectady County, New York